Proteuxoa metaneura is a moth of the family Noctuidae. It is found in the Australian Capital Territory, New South Wales, Queensland, South Australia, Victoria and Western Australia.

External links
Australian Faunal Directory

Proteuxoa
Moths of Australia
Moths described in 1908